Anne-Marie "Nanette" le Besnerais (née Anne-Marie Carbonel-Tequi; 4 January 1896 – 20 December 1981) was a French tennis player. She finished runner-up in mixed doubles at the 1926 French Championships to Suzanne Lenglen and Jacques Brugnon while competing with Jean Borotra.

References

Books

1896 births
1981 deaths
French female tennis players
20th-century French women
Sportspeople from Landes (department)